Børge Saxil Nielsen (21 February 1920 – 20 March 1977) was a Danish cyclist. He competed in the individual and team road race events at the 1948 Summer Olympics.

References

External links
 

1920 births
1977 deaths
Danish male cyclists
Olympic cyclists of Denmark
Cyclists at the 1948 Summer Olympics
Cyclists from Copenhagen